Allomyella is a genus of flies belonging to the family Scathophagidae.

The species of this genus are found in Europe and Northern America.

Species:
 Allomyella albipennis (Zetterstedt, 1838) 
 Allomyella borealis Curran, 1927

References

Scathophagidae